Aprophata is a genus of longhorn beetles of the subfamily Lamiinae, containing the following species:

 Aprophata aurorana Vives, 2009
 Aprophata eximia (Newman, 1842)
 Aprophata eximioides Breuning, 1961
 Aprophata hieroglyphica Vives, 2009
 Aprophata nigrescens Breuning, 1973
 Aprophata notha (Newman, 1842)
 Aprophata quatuordecimmaculata Breuning, 1947
 Aprophata ruficollis Heller, 1916
 Aprophata semperi (Westwood, 1863)
 Aprophata vigintiquatuormaculata Schwarzer, 1931

References

Pteropliini
Cerambycidae genera